Number Ten is a 2002 novel by Sue Townsend, about the Prime Minister of the United Kingdom (Edward Clare) attempting to take an incognito holiday with his bodyguard, Jack Sprat - in order to discover what the public truly thinks of him and his time in office - and the consequences that ensue for both men and their country. It is frequently satirical of then-Prime Minister Tony Blair, his family and his Cabinet.

The book has a political theme. It’s about the English government and all of the problems this can cause. Some problems in the book is the starvation situation in Africa, invading Iraq or not and national problems like: Hospital cues, transport problems and so on. This is the main theme throughout the book.

References

External links 
 The Guardian article
 biography

Novels by Sue Townsend
2002 British novels
British political novels
Penguin Books books